Balantak is an Austronesian language spoken at the head of the eastern peninsula of Sulawesi. It is classified as a member of the Saluan-Banggai branch of the Celebic subgroup. The Balantak language is the primary language of the Balantak people. Although 90% of the population are also proficient in Indonesian, the vernacular is still vigorously used in everyday contexts, and most children only speak Balantak before entering school.

Phonology  

Balantak has the following phoneme inventory:

Sequences of like vowels are phonetically realized as long vowels,  e.g.   'cigarette',   'coconut'.

References

Further reading

External links 
 "Balantak", at World Atlas of Language Structures

Saluan–Banggai languages
Languages of Sulawesi